Scotch-Irish (or Scots-Irish) Americans are American descendants of Ulster Protestants who emigrated from Ulster in northern Ireland to America during the 18th and 19th centuries, whose ancestors had originally migrated to Ireland  mainly from the Scottish Lowlands and Northern England in the 17th century. In the 2017 American Community Survey, 5.39 million (1.7% of the population) reported Scottish ancestry, an additional 3 million (0.9% of the population) identified more specifically with Scotch-Irish ancestry, and many people who claim "American ancestry" may actually be of Scotch-Irish ancestry. 

The term  Scotch-Irish is used primarily in the United States, with people in Great Britain or Ireland who are of a similar ancestry identifying as Ulster Scots people. Many left for America but over 100,000 Scottish Presbyterians still lived in Ulster in 1700.  Many English-born settlers of this period were also Presbyterians. When King Charles I attempted to force these Presbyterians into the Church of England in the 1630s, many chose to re-emigrate to North America where religious liberty was greater. Later attempts to force the Church of England's control over dissident Protestants in Ireland led to further waves of emigration to the trans-Atlantic colonies.

Terminology
The term is first known to have been used to refer to a people living in northeastern Ireland. In a letter of April 14, 1573, in reference to descendants of "gallowglass" mercenaries from Scotland who had settled in Ireland, Elizabeth I of England wrote:

We are given to understand that a nobleman named Sorley Boy MacDonnell and others, who be of the Scotch-Irish race ...

This term continued in usage for over a century before the earliest known American reference appeared in a Maryland affidavit in 1689–90.

Scotch-Irish, according to James Leyburn, "is an Americanism, generally unknown in Scotland and Ireland, and rarely used by British historians". It became common in the United States after 1850. The term is somewhat ambiguous because some of the Scotch-Irish have little or no Scottish ancestry at all: numerous dissenter families had also been transplanted to Ulster from northern England, in particular the border counties of Northumberland and Cumberland. Smaller numbers of migrants also came from Wales, the Isle of Man, and the southeast of England, and others were Protestant religious refugees from Flanders, the German Palatinate, and France (such as the French Huguenot ancestors of Davy Crockett). What united these different national groups was a base of Calvinist religious beliefs, and their separation from the established church (the Church of England and Church of Ireland in this case). That said, the large ethnic Scottish element in the Plantation of Ulster gave the settlements a Scottish character.

Upon arrival in North America, these migrants at first usually identified simply as Irish, without the qualifier Scotch. It was not until a century later, following the surge in Irish immigration after the Great Irish Famine of the 1840s, that the descendants of the earlier arrivals began to commonly call themselves "Scotch-Irish" to distinguish themselves from the newer, poor, predominantly Catholic immigrants. At first, the two groups had little interaction in America, as the Scots-Irish had become settled many decades earlier, primarily in the backcountry of the Appalachian region. The new wave of Catholic Irish settled primarily in port cities such as Boston, New York, Charleston, Chicago, Memphis and New Orleans, where large immigrant communities formed and there were an increasing number of jobs. Many of the new Irish migrants also went to the interior in the 19th century, attracted to jobs on large-scale infrastructure projects such as canals and railroads.

The usage Scots-Irish developed in the late 19th century as a relatively recent version of the term. Two early citations include: 1) "a grave, elderly man of the race known in America as 'Scots-Irish (1870); and 2) "Dr. Cochran was of stately presence, of fair and florid complexion, features which testified his Scots-Irish descent" (1884). In Ulster-Scots (or "Ullans"), Scotch-Irish Americans are referred to as the Scotch Airish o' Amerikey.

Twentieth-century English author Kingsley Amis endorsed the traditional Scotch-Irish usage implicitly in noting that "nobody talks about butterscottish or hopscots, ... or Scottish pine", and that while Scots or Scottish is how people of Scots origin refer to themselves in Scotland, the traditional English usage Scotch continues to be appropriate in "compounds and set phrases".

History of the term Scotch-Irish

The word "Scotch" was the favored adjective for things "of Scotland", including people, until the early 19th century, when it was replaced by the word "Scottish". People in Scotland refer to themselves as Scots, as a noun, or adjectivally/collectively as Scots or Scottish. The use of "Scotch" as an adjective has been dropped in the UK, but remains in use in the U.S. in place names, names of plants, breeds of dog, a type of tape, etc., and in the term Scotch-Irish.

Although referenced by Merriam-Webster dictionaries as having first appeared in 1744, the American term Scotch-Irish is undoubtedly older. An affidavit of William Patent, dated March 15, 1689, in a case against a Mr. Matthew Scarbrough in Somerset County, Maryland, quotes Mr. Patent as saying he was told by Scarbrough that "it was no more sin to kill me then to kill a dogg, or any Scotch Irish dogg".

Leyburn cites the following as early American uses of the term before 1744.
The earliest is a report in June 1695, by Sir Thomas Laurence, Secretary of Maryland, that "In the two counties of Dorchester and Somerset, where the Scotch-Irish are numerous, they clothe themselves by their linen and woolen manufactures."
In September 1723, Rev. George Ross, Rector of Immanuel Church in New Castle, Delaware, wrote in reference to their anti-Church of England stance that, "They call themselves Scotch-Irish ... and the bitterest railers against the church that ever trod upon American ground."
Another Church of England clergyman from Lewes, Delaware, commented in 1723 that "great numbers of Irish (who usually call themselves Scotch-Irish) have transplanted themselves and their families from the north of Ireland".

The Oxford English Dictionary says the first use of the term Scotch-Irish came in Pennsylvania in 1744: 
1744 W. MARSHE Jrnl. 21 June in Collections of the Massachusetts Historical Society. (1801) 1st Ser. VII. 177: "The inhabitants [of Lancaster, Pennsylvania] are chiefly High-Dutch, Scotch-Irish, some few English families, and unbelieving Israelites." Its citations include examples after that into the late 19th century.

In Albion's Seed: Four British Folkways in America, historian David Hackett Fischer asserts:
Some historians describe these immigrants as "Ulster Irish" or "Northern Irish". It is true that many sailed from the province of Ulster ... part of much larger flow which drew from the lowlands of Scotland, the north of England, and every side of the Irish Sea. Many scholars call these people Scotch-Irish. That expression is an Americanism, rarely used in Britain and much resented by the people to whom it was attached. "We're no Eerish bot Scoatch," one of them was heard to say in Pennsylvania.

Fischer prefers to speak of "borderers" (referring to the historically war-torn England-Scotland border) as the population ancestral to the "backcountry" "cultural stream" (one of the four major and persistent cultural streams from Ireland and Britain which he identifies in American history). He notes the borderers had substantial English and Scandinavian roots. He describes them as being quite different from Gaelic-speaking groups such as the Scottish Highlanders or Irish (that is, Gaelic-speaking and predominantly Roman Catholic).

An example of the use of the term is found in A History of Ulster: "Ulster Presbyterians – known as the "Scotch Irish" – were already accustomed to being on the move, and clearing and defending their land."

Many have claimed that such a distinction should not be used, and that those called Scotch-Irish are simply Irish. Other Irish limit the term Irish to those of native Gaelic stock, and prefer to describe the Ulster Protestants as British (a description many Ulster Protestants have preferred themselves to Irish, at least since the Irish Free State broke free from the United Kingdom, although Ulstermen has been adopted in order to maintain a distinction from the native Irish Gaels while retaining a claim to the North of Ireland). However, as one scholar observed in 1944, "in this country [the US], where they have been called Scotch-Irish for over two hundred years, it would be absurd to give them a name by which they are not known here. ... Here their name is Scotch-Irish; let us call them by it."

Migration
From 1710 to 1775, over 200,000 people emigrated from Ulster to the original thirteen American colonies. The largest numbers went to Pennsylvania. From that base some went south into Virginia, the Carolinas and across the South, with a large concentration in the Appalachian region. Others headed west to western Pennsylvania, Ohio, Indiana, and the Midwest.

Transatlantic flows were halted by the American Revolution, but resumed after 1783, with total of 100,000 arriving in America between 1783 and 1812. By that point few were young servants and more were mature craftsmen, and they settled in industrial centers, including Pittsburgh, Philadelphia and New York, where many became skilled workers, foremen and entrepreneurs as the Industrial Revolution took off in the U.S. Another half million came to America 1815 to 1845; another 900,000 came in 1851–99.  That migration decisively shaped Scotch-Irish culture.

According to the Harvard Encyclopedia of American Ethnic Groups, there were 400,000 U.S. residents of Irish birth or ancestry in 1790 and half of this group was descended from Ulster, and half from the other three provinces of Ireland.

A separate migration brought many to Canada, where they are most numerous in rural Ontario and Nova Scotia.

Origins

Because of the proximity of the islands of Britain and Ireland, migrations in both directions had been occurring since Ireland was first settled after the retreat of the ice sheets. Gaels from Ireland colonized current southwestern Scotland as part of the Kingdom of Dál Riata, eventually mixing with the native Pictish culture throughout Scotland. The Irish Gaels had previously been named Scoti by the Romans, and eventually their name was applied to the entire Kingdom of Scotland.

The origins of the Scotch-Irish lie primarily in the Lowlands of Scotland and in northern England, particularly in the Border Country on either side of the Anglo-Scottish border, a region that had seen centuries of conflict. In the near constant state of war between England and Scotland during the Middle Ages, the livelihood of the people on the borders was devastated by the contending armies. Even when the countries were not at war, tension remained high, and royal authority in one or the other kingdom was often weak. The uncertainty of existence led the people of the borders to seek security through a system of family ties, similar to the clan system in the Scottish Highlands. Known as the Border Reivers, these families relied on their own strength and cunning to survive, and a culture of cattle raiding and thievery developed.

Though remaining politically distinct, Scotland, England (considered at the time to include Wales, annexed in 1535), and Ireland came to be ruled by a single monarch with the Union of the Crowns in 1603, when James VI, King of Scots, succeeded Elizabeth I as ruler of England and Ireland. In addition to the unstable border region, James also inherited Elizabeth's conflicts in Ireland. Following the end of the Irish Nine Years' War in 1603, and the Flight of the Earls in 1607, James embarked in 1609 on a systematic plantation of English and Scottish Protestant settlers to Ireland's northern province of Ulster.  The Plantation of Ulster was seen as a way to relocate the Border Reiver families to Ireland to bring peace to the Anglo-Scottish border country, and also to provide fighting men who could suppress the native Irish in Ireland.<ref>Patrick Macrory, The Siege of Derry.', Oxford, 1980, p. 46.</ref>

The first major influx of Scots and English into Ulster had come in 1606 during the settlement of east Down onto land cleared of native Irish by private landlords chartered by James.  This process was accelerated with James's official plantation in 1609, and further augmented during the subsequent Irish Confederate Wars. The first of the Stuart Kingdoms to collapse into civil war was Ireland where, prompted in part by the anti-Catholic rhetoric of the Covenanters, Irish Catholics launched a rebellion in October, 1641. 

In reaction to the proposal by Charles I and Thomas Wentworth to raise an army manned by Irish Catholics to put down the Covenanter movement in Scotland, the Parliament of Scotland had threatened to invade Ireland in order to achieve "the extirpation of Popery out of Ireland" (according to the interpretation of Richard Bellings, a leading Irish politician of the time). The fear this caused in Ireland unleashed a wave of massacres against Protestant English and Scottish settlers, mostly in Ulster, once the rebellion had broken out. All sides displayed extreme cruelty in this phase of the war. Around 4000 settlers were massacred and a further 12,000 may have died of privation after being driven from their homes. This, along with Irish Catholic refugees fleeing, caused Ireland's population to drop by 25%. 

William Petty's figure of 37,000 Protestants massacred is far too high, perhaps by a factor of ten; certainly more recent research suggests that a much more realistic figure is roughly 4,000 deaths. In one notorious incident, the Protestant inhabitants of Portadown were taken captive and then massacred on the bridge in the town. The settlers responded in kind, as did the Dublin Castle administration, with attacks on the Irish civilian population. Massacres of native civilians occurred at Rathlin Island and elsewhere. 

In early 1642, the Covenanters sent an army to Ulster to defend the Scottish settlers there from the Irish rebels who had attacked them after the outbreak of the rebellion. The original intention of the Scottish army was to re-conquer Ireland, but due to logistical and supply problems, it was never in a position to advance far beyond its base in eastern Ulster. The Covenanter force remained in Ireland until the end of the civil wars but was confined to its garrison around Carrickfergus after its defeat by the native Ulster Army at the Battle of Benburb in 1646. After the war was over, many of the soldiers settled permanently in Ulster. Another major influx of Scots into Ulster occurred in the 1690s, when tens of thousands of people fled a famine in Scotland to come to Ireland.

A few generations after arriving in Ireland, considerable numbers of Ulster-Scots emigrated to the North American colonies of Great Britain throughout the 18th century (between 1717 and 1770 alone, about 250,000 settled in what would become the United States). According to Kerby Miller, Emigrants and Exiles: Ireland and the Irish Exodus to North America (1988), Protestants were one-third the population of Ireland, but three-quarters of all emigrants leaving from 1700 to 1776; 70% of these Protestants were Presbyterians. Other factors contributing to the mass exodus of Ulster Scots to America during the 18th century were a series of droughts and rising rents imposed by their landlords.

During the course of the 17th century, the number of settlers belonging to Calvinist dissenting sects, including Scottish and Northumbrian Presbyterians, English Baptists, French and Flemish Huguenots, and German Palatines, became the majority among the Protestant settlers in the province of Ulster. However, the Presbyterians and other dissenters, along with Catholics, were not members of the established church and were consequently legally disadvantaged by the Penal Laws, which gave full rights only to members of the Church of England or Church of Ireland.

Members of the Church of Ireland mostly consisted of the Protestant Ascendancy, Protestant settlers of English descent who formed the elite of 17th and 18th century Ireland. For this reason, up until the 19th century, and despite their common fear of Irish Catholics, there was considerable disharmony between the Presbyterians and the Protestant Ascendancy in Ulster. As a result of this, many Ulster-Scots, along with Catholic native Irish, ignored religious differences to join the United Irishmen and participate in the Irish Rebellion of 1798, in support of Age of Enlightenment-inspired egalitarian and republican goals.

American settlement

Scholarly estimate is that over 200,000 Scotch-Irish migrated to the Americas between 1717 and 1775. As a late-arriving group, they found that land in the coastal areas of the British colonies was either already owned or too expensive, so they quickly left for the more mountainous interior where land could be obtained less expensively. Here they lived on the first frontier of America. Early frontier life was challenging, but poverty and hardship were familiar to them. The term hillbilly has often been applied to their descendants in the mountains, carrying connotations of poverty, backwardness and violence.

The first trickle of Scotch-Irish settlers arrived in New England. Valued for their fighting prowess as well as for their Protestant dogma, they were invited by Cotton Mather and other leaders to come over to help settle and secure the frontier. In this capacity, many of the first permanent settlements in Maine and New Hampshire, especially after 1718, were Scotch-Irish and many place names as well as the character of Northern New Englanders reflect this fact. The Scotch-Irish brought the potato with them from Ireland (although the potato originated in South America, it was not known in North America until brought over from Europe). In Maine it became a staple crop as well as an economic base.

From 1717 for the next thirty or so years, the primary points of entry for the Ulster immigrants were Philadelphia, Pennsylvania, and New Castle, Delaware. The Scotch-Irish radiated westward across the Alleghenies, as well as into Virginia, North Carolina, South Carolina, Georgia, Kentucky, and Tennessee.  The typical migration involved small networks of related families who settled together, worshipped together, and intermarried, avoiding outsiders.

Pennsylvania and Virginia
Most Scotch-Irish landed in Philadelphia. Without much cash, they moved to free lands on the frontier, becoming the typical western "squatters", the frontier guard of the colony, and what the historian Frederick Jackson Turner described as "the cutting-edge of the frontier".

The Scotch-Irish moved up the Delaware River to Bucks County, and then up the Susquehanna and Cumberland valleys, finding flat lands along the rivers and creeks to set up their log cabins, their grist mills, and their Presbyterian churches. Chester, Lancaster, and Dauphin counties became their strongholds, and they built towns such as Chambersburg, Gettysburg, Carlisle, and York; the next generation moved into western Pennsylvania.  

With large numbers of children who needed their own inexpensive farms, the Scotch-Irish avoided areas already settled by Germans and Quakers and moved south, through the Shenandoah Valley, and through the Blue Ridge Mountains into Virginia.  These migrants followed the Great Wagon Road from Lancaster, through Gettysburg, and down through Staunton, Virginia, to Big Lick (now Roanoke), Virginia. Here the pathway split, with the Wilderness Road taking settlers west into Tennessee and Kentucky, while the main road continued south into the Carolinas.Rouse, Parke Jr., The Great Wagon Road, Dietz Press, 2004

Conflict with Native Americans
Because the Scotch-Irish settled the frontier of Pennsylvania and western Virginia, they were in the midst of the French and Indian War and Pontiac's Rebellion that followed.  The Scotch-Irish were frequently in conflict with the Indian tribes who lived on the other side of the frontier; indeed, they did most of the Indian fighting on the American frontier from New Hampshire to the Carolinas.Ray Allen Billington, Westward Expansion (1972) pp 90-109; Toby Joyce, "'The Only Good Indian Is a Dead Indian': Sheridan, Irish-America and the Indians", History Ireland 2005 13(6): 26-29  The Irish and Scots also became the middlemen who handled trade and negotiations between the Native American tribes and the colonial governments.

Especially in Pennsylvania, whose pacifist Quaker leaders had made no provision for a militia, Scotch-Irish settlements were frequently destroyed and the settlers killed, captured or forced to flee after attacks by Native Americans from tribes of the Delaware (Lenape), Shawnee, Seneca, and others of western Pennsylvania and the Ohio country.  Native American attacks took place within 60 miles of Philadelphia, and in July 1763, the Pennsylvania Assembly authorized a 700-strong militia to be raised, to be used only for defensive actions. Formed into two units of rangers, the Cumberland Boys and the Paxton Boys, the militia soon exceeded their defensive mandate and began offensive forays against Lenape villages in western Pennsylvania. After attacking Delaware villages in the upper Susquehanna valley, the militia leaders received information, which they believed credible, that "hostile" tribes were receiving weapons and ammunition from the "friendly" tribe of Conestogas settled in Lancaster County, who were under the protection of the Pennsylvania Assembly. On December 14, 1763, about fifty Paxton Boys rode to Conestogatown, near Millersville, Pennsylvania, and murdered six Conestogas. Governor John Penn placed the remaining fourteen Conestogas in protective custody in the Lancaster workhouse, but the Paxton Boys broke in, killing and mutilating all fourteen on December 27, 1763.  Following this, about 400 backcountry settlers, primarily Scotch-Irish, marched on Philadelphia demanding better military protection for their settlements, and pardons for the Paxton Boys. Benjamin Franklin led the politicians who negotiated a settlement with the Paxton leaders, after which they returned home.

American Revolution
The United States Declaration of Independence contained 56 delegate signatures. Of the signers, eight were of Irish descent.   Two signers, George Taylor and James Smith, were born in Ulster. The remaining five Irish-Americans, George Read, Thomas McKean, Thomas Lynch, Jr., Edward Rutledge and Charles Carroll, were the sons or grandsons of Irish immigrants, and at least McKean had Ulster heritage.

In contrast to the Scottish Highlanders, the Scotch-Irish were generally ardent supporters of American independence from Britain in the 1770s. In Pennsylvania, Virginia, and most of the Carolinas, support for the revolution was "practically unanimous". One Hessian officer said, "Call this war by whatever name you may, only call it not an American rebellion; it is nothing more or less than a Scotch Irish Presbyterian rebellion."  A British major general testified to the House of Commons that "half the rebel Continental Army were from Ireland".  Mecklenburg County, North Carolina, with its large Scotch-Irish population, was to make the first declaration for independence from Britain in the Mecklenburg Declaration of 1775.

The Scotch-Irish "Overmountain Men" of Virginia and North Carolina formed a militia which won the Battle of Kings Mountain in 1780, resulting in the British abandonment of a southern campaign, and for some historians "marked the turning point of the American Revolution".Theodore Roosevelt, The Winning of the West, (1906).

Loyalists
One exception to the high level of patriotism was the Waxhaw settlement on the lower Catawba River along the North Carolina-South Carolina boundary, where Loyalism was strong. The area experienced two main settlement periods of Scotch-Irish. During the 1750s–1760s, second- and third-generation Scotch-Irish Americans moved from Pennsylvania, Virginia, and North Carolina. This particular group had large families, and as a group they produced goods for themselves and for others. They generally were Patriots.

Just prior to the Revolution, a second stream of immigrants came directly from Ireland via Charleston. This group was forced to move into an underdeveloped area because they could not afford expensive land. Most of this group remained loyal to the Crown or neutral when the war began. Prior to Charles Cornwallis's march into the backcountry in 1780, two-thirds of the men among the Waxhaw settlement had declined to serve in the army. The British massacre of American prisoners at the Battle of Waxhaws resulted in anti-British sentiment in a bitterly divided region. While many individuals chose to take up arms against the British, the British themselves forced the people to choose sides.

Whiskey Rebellion
In the 1790s, the new American government assumed the debts the individual states had amassed during the American Revolutionary War, and the Congress placed a tax on whiskey (among other things) to help repay those debts. Large producers were assessed a tax of six cents a gallon. Smaller producers, many of whom were Scottish (often Scotch-Irish) descent and located in the more remote areas, were taxed at a higher rate of nine cents a gallon. These rural settlers were short of cash to begin with, and lacked any practical means to get their grain to market, other than fermenting and distilling it into relatively potable spirits.

From Pennsylvania to Georgia, the western counties engaged in a campaign of harassment of the federal tax collectors. "Whiskey Boys" also conducted violent protests in Maryland, Virginia, North Carolina and South Carolina, and Georgia. This civil disobedience eventually culminated in armed conflict in the Whiskey Rebellion. President George Washington accompanied 13,000 soldiers from Carlisle to Bedford, Pennsylvania, where plans were completed to suppress the western Pennsylvania insurrection, and he returned to Philadelphia in his carriage.

Influence on American culture and identity
Author and U.S. Senator Jim Webb puts forth a thesis in his book Born Fighting (2004) to suggest that the character traits he ascribes to the Scotch-Irish such as loyalty to kin, extreme mistrust of governmental authority and legal strictures, and a propensity to bear arms and to use them, helped shape the American identity. In the same year that Webb's book was released, Barry A. Vann published his second book, entitled Rediscovering the South's Celtic Heritage. As in his earlier book, From Whence They Came (1998), Vann argues that these traits have left their imprint on the Upland South. In 2008, Vann followed up his earlier work with a book entitled In Search of Ulster Scots Land: The Birth and Geotheological Imagings of a Transatlantic People, which professes how these traits may manifest themselves in conservative voting patterns and religious affiliation that characterizes the Bible Belt.

Iron and steel industry
The iron and steel industry developed rapidly after 1830 and became one of the dominant factors in industrial America by the 1860s. Ingham (1978) examined the leadership of the industry in its most important center, Pittsburgh, as well as smaller cities. He concludes that the leadership of the iron and steel industry nationwide was "largely Scotch-Irish". Ingham finds that the Scotch-Irish held together cohesively throughout the 19th century and "developed their own sense of uniqueness".

New immigrants after 1800 made Pittsburgh a major Scotch-Irish stronghold. For example, Thomas Mellon (b. Ulster; 1813–1908) left Ireland in 1823 and became the founder of the famous Mellon clan, which played a central role in banking and industries such as aluminum and oil. As Barnhisel (2005) finds, industrialists such as James H. Laughlin (b. Ulster; 1806–1882) of Jones and Laughlin Steel Company constituted the "Scots-Irish Presbyterian ruling stratum of Pittsburgh society".

Customs
Archeologists and folklorists have examined the folk culture of the Scotch-Irish in terms of material goods, such as housing, as well as speech patterns and folk songs. Much of the research has been done in Appalachia.

The border origin of the Scotch-Irish is supported by study of the traditional music and folklore of the Appalachian Mountains, settled primarily by the Scotch-Irish in the 18th century. Musicologist Cecil Sharp collected hundreds of folk songs in the region, and observed that the musical tradition of the people "seems to point to the North of England, or to the Lowlands, rather than the Highlands, of Scotland, as the country from which they originally migrated. For the Appalachian tunes...have far more affinity with the normal English folk-tune than with that of the Gaelic-speaking Highlander." 

Similarly, elements of mountain folklore trace back to events in the Lowlands of Scotland. As an example, it was recorded in the early 20th century that Appalachian children were frequently warned, "You must be good or Clavers will get you."  To the mountain residents, "Clavers" was simply a bogeyman used to keep children in line, yet unknown to them the phrase derives from the 17th century Scotsman John Graham of Claverhouse, called "Bloody Clavers" by the Presbyterian Scottish Lowlanders whose religion he tried to suppress.

Housing
In terms of the stone houses they built, the "hall-parlor" floor plan (two rooms per floor with chimneys on both ends) was common among the gentry in Ulster. Scotch-Irish immigrants brought it over in the 18th century and it became a common floor plan in Tennessee, Kentucky, and elsewhere. Stone houses were difficult to build, and most pioneers relied on simpler log cabins.

Quilts
Scotch-Irish quilters in West Virginia developed a unique interpretation of pieced-block quilt construction. Their quilts embody an aesthetic reflecting Scotch-Irish social history—the perennial condition of living on the periphery of mainstream society both geographically and philosophically. Cultural values espousing individual autonomy and self-reliance within a strong kinship structure are related to Scotch-Irish quilting techniques. Prominent features of these quilts include: 1) blocks pieced in a repeating pattern but varied by changing figure-ground relationships and, at times, obscured by the use of same-value colors and adjacent print fabrics, 2) lack of contrasting borders, and 3) a unified all-over quilting pattern, typically the "fans" design or rows of concentric arcs.

Language use
Montgomery (2006) analyzes the pronunciation, vocabulary, and grammatical distinctions of today's residents of the mountain South and traces patterns back to their Scotch-Irish ancestors. However, Crozier (1984) suggests that only a few lexical characteristics survived Scotch-Irish assimilation into American culture.

Number of Scotch-Irish Americans

Population in 1790
According to The Source: A Guidebook of American Genealogy, by Kory L. Meyerink and Loretto Dennis Szucs, the following were the countries of origin for new arrivals coming to the United States before 1790. The regions marked * were part of, or ruled by, the Kingdom of Great Britain (the United Kingdom of Great Britain and Ireland after 1801). The ancestry of the 3,929,326  population in 1790 has been estimated by various sources by sampling last names in the 1790 census and assigning them a country of origin. 

According to the Harvard Encyclopedia of American Ethnic Groups (Thernstrom, S 1980, "Irish," p. 528), there were 400,000 Americans of Irish birth or ancestry in 1790; half of these were descended from Ulster, and half were descended from other provinces in Ireland.

 1790 population of Scotch-Irish origin by state 
The Census Bureau produced official estimates of the colonial American population with roots in the Irish province of Ulster, in collaboration with the American Council of Learned Societies, by scholarly classification of the names of all White heads of families recorded in the 1790 Census. The government required accurate estimates of the origins of the population as basis for computing National Origins Formula immigration quotas in the 1920s (i.e. how much of the annual immigrant quota would be allotted to the Irish Free State, as opposed to Northern Ireland which remained part of the United Kingdom). The final report estimated about 10% of the U.S. population in 1790 had ancestral roots in Ireland, about three fifths of that total from Ulster–broken down by state below:

Geographical distribution
Finding the coast already heavily settled, most groups of settlers from the north of Ireland moved into the "western mountains", where they populated the Appalachian regions and the Ohio Valley. Others settled in northern New England, The Carolinas, Georgia and north-central Nova Scotia.

In the United States Census, 2000, 4.3 million Americans (1.5% of the U.S. population) claimed Scotch-Irish ancestry.

The author Jim Webb suggests that the true number of people with some Scotch-Irish heritage in the United States is in the region of 27 million.

The states with the most Scotch-Irish populations:
Texas – 287,393 (1.1%)
North Carolina – 274,149 (2.9%)
California – 247,530 (0.7%)
Florida – 170,880 (0.9%)
Pennsylvania – 163,836 (1.3%)
Tennessee – 153,073 (2.4%)
Virginia – 140,769 (1.8%)
Georgia – 124,186 (1.3%)
Ohio – 123,572 (1.1%)
South Carolina – 113,008 (2.4%)

The states with the top percentages of Scotch-Irish:
 North Carolina (2.9%)
 South Carolina, Tennessee (2.4%)
 West Virginia (2.1%)
 Montana, Virginia (1.8%)
 Maine (1.7%)
 Alabama, Mississippi (1.6%)
 Kentucky, Oregon, Wyoming (1.5%)

 2020 population of Scottish ancestry by state 
As of 2020, the distribution of self-identified Scotch-Irish Americans across the 50 states and DC is as presented in the following table:  

Religion
The Scotch-Irish immigrants to North America in the 18th century were initially defined in part by their Presbyterianism.  Many of the settlers in the Plantation of Ulster had been from dissenting and non-conformist religious groups which professed Calvinist thought. These included mainly Lowland Scot Presbyterians, but also English Puritans and Quakers, French Huguenots and German Palatines. These Calvinist groups mingled freely in church matters, and religious belief was more important than nationality, as these groups aligned themselves against both their Catholic Irish and Anglican English neighbors.

After their arrival in the New World, the predominantly Presbyterian Scotch-Irish began to move further into the mountainous back-country of Virginia and the Carolinas. The establishment of many settlements in the remote back-country put a strain on the ability of the Presbyterian Church to meet the new demand for qualified, college-educated clergy. Religious groups such as the Baptists and Methodists had no higher education requirement for their clergy to be ordained, and these groups readily provided ministers to meet the demand of the growing Scotch-Irish settlements.  By about 1810, Baptist and Methodist churches were in the majority, and the descendants of the Scotch-Irish today remain predominantly Baptist or Methodist.  Vann (2007) shows the Scotch-Irish played a major role in defining the Bible Belt in the Upper South in the 18th century. He emphasizes the high educational standards they sought, their "geotheological thought worlds" brought from the old country, and their political independence that was transferred to frontier religion.

Princeton
In 1746, the Scotch-Irish Presbyterians created the College of New Jersey, later renamed Princeton University. The mission was training New Light Presbyterian ministers. The college became the educational as well as religious capital of Scotch-Irish America. By 1808, loss of confidence in the college within the Presbyterian Church led to the establishment of the separate Princeton Theological Seminary, but for many decades Presbyterian control over Princeton College continued. Meanwhile, Princeton Seminary, under the leadership of Charles Hodge, originated a conservative theology that in large part shaped Fundamentalist Protestantism in the 20th century.

Associate Reformed Church
While the larger Presbyterian Church was a mix of Scotch-Irish and Yankees from New England, several smaller Presbyterian groups were composed almost entirely of Scotch-Irish, and they display the process of assimilation into the broader American religious culture. Fisk (1968) traces the history of the Associate Reformed Church in the Old Northwest from its formation by a union of Associate and Reformed Presbyterians in 1782 to the merger of this body with the Seceder Scotch-Irish bodies to form the United Presbyterian Church in 1858. It became the Associate Reformed Synod of the West and remains centered in the Midwest. It withdrew from the parent body in 1820 because of the drift of the eastern churches toward assimilation into the larger Presbyterian Church with its Yankee traits. The Associate Reformed Synod of the West maintained the characteristics of an immigrant church with Scotch-Irish roots, emphasized the Westminster standards, used only the psalms in public worship, was Sabbatarian, and was strongly abolitionist and anti-Catholic. In the 1850s it exhibited many evidences of assimilation. It showed greater ecumenical interest, greater interest in evangelization of the West and of the cities, and a declining interest in maintaining the unique characteristics of its Scotch-Irish past.

Notable people

U.S. presidents

Many presidents of the United States have ancestral links to Ulster, including three whose parents were born in Ulster. Three presidents had at least one parent born in Ulster: Andrew Jackson, James Buchanan and Chester Arthur. The Irish Protestant vote in the U.S. has not been studied as much as that of the Catholic Irish. In the 1820s and 1830s, Jackson supporters emphasized his Irish background, as did supporters of James Knox Polk, but since the 1840s it has been uncommon for a Protestant politician in America to be identified as Irish, but rather as "Scotch-Irish". In Canada, by contrast, Irish Protestants remained a cohesive political force well into the 20th century, identified with the then Conservative Party of Canada and especially with the Orange Institution, although this is less evident in today's politics.

More than one-third of all U.S. presidents had substantial ancestral origins in the northern province of Ireland (Ulster). President Bill Clinton spoke proudly of that fact, and his own ancestral links with the province, during his two visits to Ulster. Like most U.S. citizens, most U.S. presidents are the result of a "melting pot" of ancestral origins.

Clinton is one of at least seventeen Chief Executives descended from emigrants to the United States from Ulster. While many of the presidents have typically Ulster-Scots surnames – Jackson, Johnson, McKinley, Wilson – others, such as Roosevelt and Cleveland, have links which are less obvious.

Andrew Jackson
7th president, 1829–1837: He was born in the predominantly Ulster-Scots Waxhaws area of South Carolina two years after his parents left Boneybefore, near Carrickfergus in County Antrim. A heritage centre in the village pays tribute to the legacy of "Old Hickory". Andrew Jackson then moved to Tennessee, where he began a prominent political and military career. (U.S. Senator from Tennessee, 1797–1798 & 1823–1825; U.S. House Representative from Tennessee's at-large congressional district, 1796–1797; Tennessee Supreme Court Judge, 1798–1804; Military Governor of Florida, 1821; U.S. Army Major General, 1814–1821; U.S. Volunteers Major General, 1812–1814; Tennessee State Militia Major General, 1802–1812; Tennessee State Militia Colonel, 1801–1802)
James K. Polk
11th president, 1845–1849: His ancestors were among the first Ulster-Scots settlers, emigrating from Coleraine in 1680 to become a powerful political family in Mecklenburg County, North Carolina. He moved to Tennessee and became its governor before winning the presidency. (13th Speaker of the U.S. House of Representatives, 1835–1839; 9th Governor of Tennessee, 1839–1841; U.S. House Representative from Tennessee's 6th congressional district, 1825–1833; U.S. House Representative from Tennessee's 9th congressional district, 1833–1839; Tennessee State Representative, 1823–1825)
James Buchanan
15th president, 1857–1861: Born in a log cabin (which has been relocated to his old school in Mercersburg, Pennsylvania), "Old Buck" cherished his origins: "My Ulster blood is a priceless heritage". His father was born in Ramelton in County Donegal, Ireland. The Buchanans were originally from Stirlingshire, Scotland where the ancestral home still stands. (17th U.S. Secretary of State, 1845–1849; U.S. Senator from Pennsylvania, (1834–1845); U.S. House Representative from Pennsylvania's 3rd congressional district, 1821–1823; U.S. House Representative from Pennsylvania's 4th congressional district, 1823–1831; U.S. Minister to the Russian Empire, 1832–1833; U.S. Minister to the United Kingdom of Great Britain and Ireland, 1853–1856; Pennsylvania State Representative, 1814–1816)
Andrew Johnson
17th president, 1865–1869: His grandfather left Mounthill, near Larne in County Antrim around 1750 and settled in North Carolina. Andrew worked there as a tailor and ran a successful business in Greeneville, Tennessee, before being elected vice president. He became president following Abraham Lincoln's assassination. (16th vice president of the United States, 1865; U.S. Senator from Tennessee, 1857–1862 & 1875; 15th Governor of Tennessee, 1853–1857; U.S. House Representative from Tennessee's 1st congressional district, 1843–1853; Tennessee State Senator, 1841–1843; Tennessee State Representative, 1835–1837 & 1839–1841; Greeneville, Tennessee Mayor, 1834–1838; Greeneville, Tennessee Alderman, 1828–1830; Military Governor of Tennessee, 1862–1865; Union Army Brigadier General, 1862–1865)
Ulysses S. Grant
18th president, 1869–1877: The home of his maternal great-grandfather, John Simpson, at Dergenagh, County Tyrone, is the location for an exhibition on the eventful life of the victorious Civil War commander who served two terms as president. Grant visited his ancestral homeland in 1878. The home of John Simpson still stands in County Tyrone. (Acting U.S. Secretary of War, 1867–1868; Commanding General of the U.S. Army, 1864–1869; U.S./Union Army Lieutenant General, 1864–1866; Union Army Major General, 1862–1864; Union Army Brigadier General, 1861–1862; Union Army Colonel, 1861; U.S. Army Captain, 1853–1854; U.S. Army Brevet Captain, 1847–1848; U.S. Army 2nd Lieutenant, 1843–1853)
Chester A. Arthur
21st president, 1881–1885: His succession to the Presidency after the death of Garfield was the start of a quarter-century in which the White House was occupied by men of Ulster-Scots origins. His family left Dreen, near Cullybackey, County Antrim, in 1815. There is now an interpretive centre, alongside the Arthur Ancestral Home, devoted to his life and times. (20th vice president of the United States, 1881; New York Port Collector, 1871–1878; New York Guard Quartermaster General, 1862–1863; New York Guard Inspector General, 1862; New York Guard Engineer-in-Chief, 1861–1863)
Grover Cleveland
22nd and 24th president, 1885–1889 and 1893–1897: Born in New Jersey, he was the maternal grandson of merchant Abner Neal, who emigrated from County Antrim in the 1790s. He is the only president to have served non-consecutive terms. (28th Governor of New York, 1883–1885; 34th Mayor of Buffalo, New York, 1882; Erie County, New York Sheriff, 1871–1873)
Benjamin Harrison
23rd president, 1889–1893: His mother, Elizabeth Irwin, had Ulster-Scots roots through her two great-grandfathers, James Irwin and William McDowell. Harrison was born in Ohio and served as a brigadier general in the Union Army before embarking on a career in Indiana politics which led to the White House. (U.S. Senator from Indiana, 1881–1887; Union Army Brevet Brigadier General, 1865; Union Army Colonel, 1862–1865; Union Army Captain, 1862)
William McKinley
25th president, 1897–1901: Born in Ohio, the descendant of a farmer from Conagher, near Ballymoney, County Antrim, he was proud of his ancestry and addressed one of the national Scotch-Irish congresses held in the late 19th century. His second term as president was cut short by an assassin's bullet. (39th Governor of Ohio, 1892–1896; U.S. House Representative from Ohio's 18th congressional district, 1887–1891; U.S. House Representative from Ohio's 20th congressional district, 1885–1887; U.S. House Representative from Ohio's 18th congressional district, 1883–1884; U.S. House Representative from Ohio's 17th congressional district, 1881–1883; U.S. House Representative from Ohio's 16th congressional district, 1879–1881; U.S. House Representative from Ohio's 17th congressional district, 1877–1879; Union Army Brevet Brigadier General, 1865; Union Army Colonel, 1862–1865; Union Army Captain, 1862)
Theodore Roosevelt
26th president, 1901–1909: His mother, Mittie Bulloch, had Ulster Scots ancestors who emigrated from Glenoe, County Antrim, in May 1729. Roosevelt praised "Irish Presbyterians" as "a bold and hardy race". However, he is also the man who said: "But a hyphenated American is not an American at all. This is just as true of the man who puts "native"* before the hyphen as of the man who puts German or Irish or English or French before the hyphen." (*Roosevelt was referring to "nativists", not American Indians, in this context) (25th vice president of the United States, 1901; 33rd Governor of New York, 1899–1900; Assistant Secretary of the Navy, 1897–1898; New York City Police Commissioners Board president, 1895–1897; New York State Assembly Minority Leader, 1883; New York State Assembly Member, 1882–1884)
William Howard Taft
27th president, 1909–1913: First known ancestor of the Taft family in the United States, Robert Taft Sr., was born in County Louth circa 1640 (where his father, Richard Robert Taft, also died in 1700), before migrating to Braintree, Massachusetts in 1675, and settling in Mendon, Massachusetts in 1680. (10th Chief Justice of the United States, 1921–1930; 42nd U.S. Secretary of War, 1904–1908; 1st Provisional Governor of Cuba, 1906; 1st Governor-General of the Philippines, 1901–1903; U.S. 6th Circuit Court of Appeals Judge, 1892–1900; 6th U.S. Solicitor General, 1890–1892)
Woodrow Wilson
28th president, 1913–1921: Of Ulster-Scot descent on both sides of the family, his roots were very strong and dear to him. He was grandson of a printer from Dergalt, near Strabane, County Tyrone, whose former home is open to visitors. (34th Governor of New Jersey, 1911–1913; Princeton University president, 1902–1910)
Harry S. Truman
33rd president, 1945–1953: Of Ulster-Scot descent on both sides of the family. (34th vice president of the United States, 1945; U.S. Senator from Missouri, 1935–1945; Jackson County, Missouri Presiding Judge, 1927–1935; U.S. Army Reserve Colonel, 1932–1953; U.S. Army Reserve Lieutenant Colonel, 1925–1932; U.S. Army Reserve Major, 1920–1925; U.S. Army Major, 1919; U.S. Army Captain, 1918–1919; U.S. Army 1st Lieutenant, 1917–1918; Missouri National Guard Corporal, 1905–1911)
Lyndon B. Johnson
36th president, 1963–1969: Of Ulster-Scot ancestry with patrilineal descent traced to Dumfriesshire, Scotland in 1590. (37th vice president of the United States, 1961–1963; U.S. Senate Majority Leader, 1955–1961; U.S. Senate Minority Leader, 1953–1955; U.S. Senate Majority Whip, 1951–1953; U.S. Senator from Texas, 1949–1961; U.S. House Representative from Texas's 10th congressional district, 1937–1949; U.S. Naval Reserve Commander, 1940–1964)
Richard Nixon
37th president, 1969–1974: The Nixon ancestors left Ulster in the mid-18th century; the Quaker Milhous family ties were with County Antrim and County Kildare. (36th vice president of the United States, 1953–1961; U.S. Senator from California, 1950–1953; U.S. House Representative from California's 12th congressional district, 1947–1950; U.S. Naval Reserve Commander, 1953–1966; U.S. Naval Reserve Lieutenant Commander, 1945–1953; U.S. Naval Reserve Lieutenant, 1943–1945; U.S. Naval Reserve Lieutenant J.G., 1942–1943)
Jimmy Carter
39th president, 1977–1981: Some of Carter's paternal ancestors originated from County Antrim, County Londonderry and County Armagh and some of his maternal ancestors originated from County Londonderry, County Down, and County Donegal. (76th Governor of Georgia, 1971–1975; Georgia State Senator, 1963–1967; U.S. Navy Reserve Lieutenant J.G., 1953–1961; U.S. Navy Lieutenant J.G., 1949–1953; U.S. Navy Ensign, 1946–1949)
George H. W. Bush
41st president, 1989–1993: Of Ulster-Scot ancestry. (43rd vice president of the United States, 1981–1989; Director of Central Intelligence, 1976–1977; 2nd U.S. Beijing Liaison Office Chief, 1974–1975; 10th U.S. Ambassador to the United Nations, 1971–1973; U.S. House Representative from Texas's 7th congressional district, 1967–1971; U.S. Navy Lieutenant J.G., 1942–1945)
Bill Clinton
42nd president, 1993–2001: Of Ulster-Scot ancestry. (40th & 42nd Governor of Arkansas, 1979–1981 & 1983–1992; 50th Arkansas Attorney General, 1977–1979)
George W. Bush
43rd president, 2001–2009: Of Ulster-Scot ancestry. (46th Governor of Texas, 1995–2000); Texas Air National Guard First Lieutenant, 1968–1974)
Barack Obama
44th president, 2009–2017: Of Scots-Irish ancestry on mother's side. (U.S. Senator from Illinois, 2005–2008; Illinois State Senator, 1997–2004)

See also

Lists of Americans
Appalachia
Battle of Kings Mountain
English Americans
Hatfield–McCoy feud
Irish Americans
List of Scotch-Irish Americans
Scottish Americans
Ulster American Folk Park
Whiskey Rebellion
Scotch-Irish Canadians

References

Further reading
  Cultural discussion and commentary of Scots-Irish descendants in the US.
  Scholars analyze colonial migrations. Excerpts online
 Baxter, Nancy M. Movers: A Saga of the Scotch-Irish (The Heartland Chronicles) (1986) Novelistic.
 Blethen, Tyler. ed. Ulster and North America: Transatlantic Perspectives on the Scotch-Irish (1997), scholarly essays.
 
 
 
 Chepesiuk, Ron.  The Scotch-Irish: From the North of Ireland to the Making of America
 Drymon, M. M.Scotch-Irish Foodways in America(2009;)
 Dunaway, Wayland F. The Scotch-Irish of Colonial Pennsylvania (1944; reprinted 1997), solid older scholarly history.
  Literary/historical family memoir of Scotch-Irish Missouri/Oklahoma family.
 Esbenshade, Richard. "Scotch-Irish Americans." in Gale Encyclopedia of Multicultural America, edited by Thomas Riggs, (3rd ed., vol. 4, Gale, 2014), pp. 87-100. Online free
  Major scholarly study tracing colonial roots of four groups of immigrants, Irish, English Puritans, English Cavaliers, and Quakers; see pp. 605–778.
 Glasgow, Maude.  The Scotch-Irish in Northern Ireland and in the American Colonies (1998)
 Glazier, Michael, ed. The Encyclopedia of the Irish in America, (1999), the best place to start—the most authoritative source, with essays by over 200 experts, covering both Catholic and Protestants.
 Griffin, Patrick. The People with No Name: Ireland's Ulster Scots, America's Scots Irish, and the Creation of a British Atlantic World: 1689-1764 (2001) solid academic monograph.
Hammock, Stephen A. Emigrants, Sails, and Scholars: A Comprehensive Review of Scots-Irish Historiography, Scots Press. (2013).
 Johnson, James E. Scots and Scotch-Irish in America (1985) short overview for middle schools
 
 Kennedy, Billy. Faith & Freedom: The Scots-Irish in America (1999) Short, popular chronicle; he has several similar books on geographical regions
 Kennedy, Billy. The Scots-Irish in the Carolinas (1997)
 Kennedy, Billy. The Scots-Irish in the Shenandoah Valley (1996)
 Lewis, Thomas A. West From Shenandoah: A Scotch-Irish Family Fights for America, 1729–1781, A Journal of Discovery (2003)
 Leyburn, James G. Scotch-Irish: A Social History (1999) written by academic but out of touch with scholarly literature after 1940
 
  Highly influential economic interpretation; online at JSTOR through most academic libraries. Their Celtic interpretation says Scots-Irish resembled all other Celtic groups; they were warlike herders (as opposed to peaceful farmers in England), and brought this tradition to America. James Webb has popularized this thesis.
 
  Major exploration of cultural folkways.
 Meagher, Timothy J. The Columbia Guide to Irish American History. (2005), overview and bibliographies; includes the Catholics.
  Major source of primary documents.
  Highly influential study.
 Porter, Lorle. A People Set Apart: The Scotch-Irish in Eastern Ohio (1999) highly detailed chronicle.
 Quinlan, Kieran. Strange Kin: Ireland and the American South (2004), critical analysis of Celtic thesis.
 Sletcher, Michael, "Scotch-Irish", in Stanley I. Kutler, ed., Dictionary of American History, (10 vols., New York, 2002).
  Discusses the origins of the Scotch-Irish and argues that their contributions in American history had been vastly overlooked
 
 
 
  Novelistic approach; special attention to his people's war with English in America.
 Berthoff, Rowland.  "Celtic Mist over the South", Journal of Southern History'' 52 (1986): 523-46 is a strong attack; rejoinder on 547-50

External links
The Ulster-Scots Society of America
Scotch-Irish Society of the USA
Ulster-Scots Language Society
Scotch-Irish or Scots-Irish: What's in a Name?
Ulster-Scots Agency
Ulster-Scots Online
Institute of Ulster-Scots
Theodore Roosevelt's genealogy
The Scotch-Irish in America (by Henry Jones Ford)
The Scotch-Irish in America (by Samuel Swett Green)
Origin of the Scotch-Irish, Ch. 5 in Sketches of North Carolina by William Henry Foote (1846) - full-text history
Chronicles of the Scotch-Irish Settlement in Virginia - Extracted from the Original Court Records of Augusta County 1745-1800 by Lyman Chalkley
Peyton's History of Augusta County, Virginia (1882) - full-text history with many mentions of Scotch-Irish
Waddell's Annals of Augusta County, Virginia, from 1726 to 1871, Second Ed. (1902) - full-text history with many mentions of Scotch-Irish
"Ideas & Trends: Southern Curse; Why America's Murder Rate Is So High", New York Times, July 26, 1998
Bethesda Presbyterian Church - York County, S.C.

 
European-American society
English diaspora
 
 
Scottish diaspora
British diaspora by country
Irish diaspora